Thomas or Tom Walker may refer to:

Entertainment
 Thomas Walker (actor) (1698–1744), English actor and dramatist
 Thomas Walker (author) (1784–1836), English barrister, police magistrate and writer of a one-man periodical, The Original
 Thomas Bond Walker (1861–1933), Irish painter
 Tom Walker (singer) (born 1991), Scottish singer-songwriter
 Tom Walker (Homeland), a character in the TV series Homeland
 Tom Walker, British actor and comedian known for his character Jonathan Pie, a fictional British news reporter
 Tom Walker (comedian), Australian comedian, mime and Twitch streamer

Law
 Thomas Joseph Walker (1877–1945), Judge for the United States Customs Court
 Thomas Glynn Walker (1899–1993), United States federal judge
 Thomas Walker (attorney) (born 1964), U.S. attorney

Politics
 Thomas Walker (died 1748) (1660s–1748), Member of Parliament for Plympton Erle, 1735–1741
 Thomas Walker (merchant) (1749–1817), English political radical in Manchester
 Thomas Eades Walker (1843–1899), British Member of Parliament for East Worcestershire, 1874–1880
 Thomas Gordon Walker (1849–1917), British Indian civil servant
 Thomas Walker (Australian politician) (1858–1932), member of two different state parliaments
 Thomas Walker (Canadian politician) (died 1812), Canadian lawyer and politician
 Thomas J. Walker (1927–1998), provincial MLA from Alberta, Canada
 Thomas Walker (American politician) (1850 - 1935), Alabama state legislator

Sports
 Tom Walker (cricketer) (1762–1831), English cricketer
 Thomas Walker (Yorkshire cricketer) (1854–1925), English cricketer
 Tom Walker (1900s pitcher) (1881–1944), baseball player
 Tom Walker (1970s pitcher) (born 1948), American baseball player
 Tommy Walker (footballer, born 1915) (1915–1993), Scottish footballer and manager
 Tom Walker (footballer) (born 1995), English footballer

Other
 Thomas Walker (academic) (died 1665), English academic at Oxford University
 Thomas Walker (explorer) (1715–1794), American explorer
 Thomas Walker (slave trader) (1758–1797), British slave trader
 Thomas Walker (died 1805), Irish publisher of Walker's Hibernian Magazine
 Thomas Walker (philanthropist) (1804–1886), Australian politician and banker
 Thomas Larkins Walker (c.1811–1860), Scottish architect
 Thomas Walker (journalist) (1822–1898), English editor of The Daily News
 Thomas A. Walker (1828–1889), English civil engineering contractor
 T. B. Walker (1840–1928), Minneapolis businessman who founded the Walker Art Center
 Thomas William Walker (1916–2010), soil scientist
 Thomas Walker (naval officer) (1919–2003), United States Navy officer
 Thomas B. Walker Jr. (1923–2016), American investment banker, corporate director and philanthropist
 Tom Walker (priest) (born 1933), Anglican priest and author
 Thomas J. Walker, namesake of the Thomas J. Walker House in Knoxville, Tennessee
Thomas Walker & Son, manufacturers of nautical instruments, Birmingham, England

See also 
 Tommy Walker (disambiguation)